Annelie Minny (born 15 November 1986) is a South African former cricketer who played as a right-handed batter, right-arm off break bowler and occasional wicket-keeper. She appeared in 14 One Day Internationals and five Twenty20 Internationals for South Africa in 2007 and 2008. She played domestic cricket for Free State and Griqualand West.

References

External links
 
 

1986 births
Living people
Cricketers from Kimberley, Northern Cape
South African women cricketers
South Africa women One Day International cricketers
South Africa women Twenty20 International cricketers
Free State women cricketers
Northern Cape cricketers
Wicket-keepers